Unitarianism (from Latin unitas "unity, oneness", from unus "one") is a Nontrinitarian branch of Christianity. Unitarian Christians affirm the unitary nature of God as the singular and unique creator of the universe, believe that Jesus Christ was inspired by God in his moral teachings and that he is the savior of humankind, but he is not comparable or equal to God himself.

Unitarianism was established in order to restore "primitive Christianity before [what Unitarians saw as] later corruptions setting in"; Likewise, Unitarian Christians generally reject the doctrine of original sin. The churchmanship of Unitarianism may include liberal denominations or Unitarian Christian denominations that are more conservative, with the latter being known as biblical Unitarians.

The birth of the Unitarian faith is proximate to the Radical Reformation, beginning almost simultaneously among the Protestant Polish Brethren in the Polish–Lithuanian Commonwealth and in the Principality of Transylvania in the mid-16th century; the first Unitarian Christian denomination known to have emerged during that time was the Unitarian Church of Transylvania, founded by the Unitarian preacher and theologian Ferenc Dávid (c. 1520–1579). Among its adherents were a significant number of Italians who took refuge in Bohemia, Moravia, Poland, and Transylvania in order to escape from the religious persecution perpetrated against them by the Roman Catholic and Protestant churches. In the 17th century, significant repression in Poland led many Unitarians to flee or be killed for their faith. From the 16th to 18th centuries, Unitarians in Britain often faced significant political persecution, including John Biddle, Mary Wollstonecraft, and Theophilus Lindsey. In England, the first Unitarian Church was established in 1774 on Essex Street, London, where today's British Unitarian headquarters is still located.

As is typical of dissenters, Unitarianism does not constitute one single Christian denomination; rather, it refers to a collection of both existing and extinct Christian groups (whether historically related to each other or not) that share a common theological concept of the unitary nature of God. Unitarian Christian communities and churches have developed in Central Europe (mostly Romania and Hungary), Ireland, India, Jamaica, Japan, Canada, Nigeria, South Africa, the United Kingdom, and the United States.

In the United States, different schools of Unitarian theology first spread in New England and the Mid-Atlantic States. The first official acceptance of the Unitarian faith on the part of a congregation in North America was by King's Chapel in Boston, from where James Freeman began teaching Unitarian doctrine in 1784 and was appointed rector. Later in 1785, he created a revised Unitarian Book of Common Prayer based on Lindsey's work.

Terminology 

Unitarianism is a proper noun and follows the same English usage as other Christian theologies that have developed within a religious group or denomination (such as Calvinism, Anabaptism, Adventism, Lutheranism, Wesleyanism, etc.). The term existed shortly before it became the name of a distinct religious tradition, thus occasionally it is used as a common noun to describe any understanding of Jesus Christ that denies the doctrine of the Trinity or affirms the belief that God is only one person. In that case, it would be a Nontrinitarian belief system not necessarily associated with the Unitarian movement. For example, the Unitarian movement has never accepted the Godhood of Jesus, and therefore does not include those nontrinitarian belief systems that do, such as Oneness Pentecostalism, United Pentecostal Church International, the True Jesus Church, and the writings of Michael Servetus (all of which maintain that Jesus is God as a single person).  Recently, some religious groups have adopted the 19th-century term biblical unitarianism to distinguish their theologies from Unitarianism.

The term Unitarian is sometimes applied today to those who belong to a Unitarian church but do not hold a Unitarian theological belief. In the past, most members of Unitarian churches were Unitarians also in theology. Over time, however, some Unitarians and Unitarian Universalists moved away from the traditional Christian roots of Unitarianism.  For example, in the 1890s the American Unitarian Association began to allow non-Christian and non-theistic churches and individuals to be part of their fellowship.  As a result, people who held no Unitarian belief began to be called Unitarians because they were members of churches that belonged to the American Unitarian Association. After several decades, the non-theistic members outnumbered the theological Unitarians. For a more specific discussion of Unitarianism as it evolved into a pluralistic liberal religious movement, see Unitarian Universalism (and its national groups the Unitarian Universalist Association in the United States, the Canadian Unitarian Council in Canada, the General Assembly of Unitarian and Free Christian Churches in the United Kingdom, and the International Council of Unitarians and Universalists).

History 

Unitarianism, both as a theology and as a denominational family of churches, was defined and developed in Poland, Transylvania, England, Wales, India, Japan, Jamaica, the United States, and beyond in the 16th century through the present.   Although common beliefs existed among Unitarians in each of these regions, they initially grew independently from each other. Only later did they influence one another and accumulate more similarities.

The Ecclesia minor or Minor Reformed Church of Poland, better known today as the Polish Brethren, was born as the result of a controversy that started on January 22, 1556, when Piotr of Goniądz (Peter Gonesius), a Polish student, spoke out against the doctrine of the Trinity during the general synod of the Reformed (Calvinist) churches of Poland held in the village of Secemin. After nine years of debate, in 1565, the anti-Trinitarians were excluded from the existing synod of the Polish Reformed Church (henceforth the Ecclesia maior) and they began to hold their own synods as the Ecclesia minor. Though frequently called "Arians" by those on the outside, the views of Fausto Sozzini (Faustus Socinus) became the standard in the church, and these doctrines were quite removed from Arianism. So important was Socinus to the formulation of their beliefs that those outside Poland usually referred to them as Socinians. The Polish Brethren were disbanded in 1658 by the Sejm (Polish Parliament). They were ordered to convert to Roman Catholicism or leave Poland. Most of them went to Transylvania or Holland, where they embraced the name "Unitarian". Between 1665 and 1668 a grandson of Socinus, Andrzej Wiszowaty Sr., published Bibliotheca Fratrum Polonorum quos Unitarios vocant (Library of the Polish Brethren who are called Unitarians 4 vols. 1665–1669).

The Unitarian Church in Transylvania was first recognized by the Edict of Torda, issued by the Transylvanian Diet under Prince John II Sigismund Zápolya (January 1568), and was first led by Ferenc Dávid (a former Calvinist bishop, who had begun preaching the new doctrine in 1566). The term "Unitarian" first appeared as unitaria religio in a document of the Diet of Lécfalva, Transylvania, on 25 October 1600, though it was not widely used in Transylvania until 1638, when the formal recepta Unitaria Religio was published.

The word Unitarian had been circulating in private letters in England, in reference to imported copies of such publications as the Library of the Polish Brethren who are called Unitarians (1665). Henry Hedworth was the first to use the word "Unitarian" in print in English (1673), and the word first appears in a title in Stephen Nye's A brief history of the Unitarians, called also Socinians (1687). The movement gained popularity in England in the wake of the Enlightenment and began to become a formal denomination in 1774 when Theophilus Lindsey organised meetings with Joseph Priestley, founding the first avowedly Unitarian congregation in the country. This occurred at Essex Street Church in London. Official toleration came in 1813.

The first official acceptance of the Unitarian faith on the part of a congregation in America was by King's Chapel in Boston, which settled James Freeman (1759–1835) in 1782, and revised the Prayer Book into a mild Unitarian liturgy in 1785. In 1800, Joseph Stevens Buckminster became minister of the Brattle Street Church in Boston, where his brilliant sermons, literary activities, and academic attention to the German "New Criticism" helped shape the subsequent growth of Unitarianism in New England. Unitarian Henry Ware (1764–1845) was appointed as the Hollis professor of divinity at Harvard College, in 1805. Harvard Divinity School then shifted from its conservative roots to teach Unitarian theology (see Harvard and Unitarianism). Buckminster's close associate William Ellery Channing (1780–1842) was settled over the Federal Street Church in Boston, 1803, and in a few years he became the leader of the Unitarian movement. A theological battle with the Congregational Churches resulted in the formation of the American Unitarian Association at Boston in 1825. Certainly, the unitarian theology was being "adopted" by the Congregationalists from the 1820s onwards. This movement is also evident in England at this time.

Beliefs

Christology 

Unitarians charge that the Trinity, unlike unitarianism, fails to adhere to strict monotheism. Unitarians maintain that Jesus was a great man and a prophet of God, perhaps even a supernatural being, but not God himself. They believe Jesus did not claim to be God and that his teachings did not suggest the existence of a triune God.

Unitarian Christology can be divided according to whether or not Jesus is believed to have had a pre-human existence. Both forms maintain that God is one being and one "person" and that Jesus is the (or a) Son of God, but generally not God himself.

In the early 19th century, Unitarian Robert Wallace identified three particular classes of Unitarian doctrines in history:
 Arian, which believed in a pre-existence of the Logos;
 Socinian, which denied his pre-existence, but agreed that Christ should be worshipped; and
 "Strict Unitarian", which, believing in an "incommunicable divinity of God", denied the worship of "the man Christ."

Unitarianism is considered a factor in the decline of classical deism because there were people who increasingly preferred to identify themselves as Unitarians rather than deists.

Several tenets of Unitarianism overlap with the predominant Muslim view of Jesus and Islamic understanding of monotheism.

"Socinian" Christology 

The Christology commonly called "Socinian" (after Fausto Sozzini, one of the founders of Unitarian theology) refers to the belief that Jesus Christ began his life when he was born as a human. In other words, the teaching that Jesus pre-existed his human body is rejected. There are various views ranging from the belief that Jesus was simply a human (psilanthropism) who, because of his greatness, was adopted by God as his Son (adoptionism) to the belief that Jesus literally became the son of God when he was conceived by the Holy Spirit.

This Christology existed in some form or another prior to Sozzini. Theodotus of Byzantium, Artemon and Paul of Samosata denied the pre-existence of Christ. These ideas were continued by Marcellus of Ancyra and his pupil Photinus in the 4th century AD. In the Radical Reformation and Anabaptist movements of the 16th century this idea resurfaced with Sozzini's uncle, Lelio Sozzini. Having influenced the Polish Brethren to a formal declaration of this belief in the Racovian Catechism, Fausto Sozzini involuntarily ended up giving his name to this Christological position, which continued with English Unitarians such as John Biddle, Thomas Belsham, Theophilus Lindsey, Joseph Priestley, and James Martineau. In America, most of the early Unitarians were "Arian" in Christology (see below), but among those who held to a "Socinian" view was James Freeman.

Regarding the virgin birth of Jesus among those who denied the preexistence of Christ, some held to it and others did not. Its denial is sometimes ascribed to the Ebionites; however, Origen (Contra Celsum v.61) and Eusebius (HE iii.27) both indicate that some Ebionites did accept the virgin birth. On the other hand, Theodotus of Byzantium, Artemon, and Paul of Samosata all accepted the virgin birth. In the early days of Unitarianism, the stories of the virgin birth were accepted by most. There were a number of Unitarians who questioned the historical accuracy of the Bible, including Symon Budny, Jacob Palaeologus, Thomas Belsham, and Richard Wright, and this made them question the virgin birth story. Beginning in England and America in the 1830s, and manifesting itself primarily in Transcendentalist Unitarianism, which emerged from the German liberal theology associated primarily with Friedrich Schleiermacher, the psilanthropist view increased in popularity. Its proponents took an intellectual and humanistic approach to religion. They embraced evolutionary concepts, asserted the "inherent goodness of man", and abandoned the doctrine of biblical infallibility, rejecting most of the miraculous events in the Bible (including the virgin birth). Notable examples are James Martineau, Theodore Parker, Ralph Waldo Emerson and Frederic Henry Hedge. Famous American Unitarian William Ellery Channing was a believer in the virgin birth until later in his life, after he had begun his association with the Transcendentalists.

Arianism 

Arianism is often considered a form of Unitarianism.

The Christology of Arianism holds that Jesus, before his human life, existed as the Logos, or the Word, a being created by God, who dwelt with God in heaven. There are many varieties of this form of Unitarianism, ranging from the belief that the Son was a divine spirit of the same nature as God before coming to earth, to the belief that he was an angel or other lesser spirit creature of a wholly different nature from God. Not all of these views necessarily were held by Arius, the namesake of this Christology. It is still Nontrinitarian because, according to this belief system, Jesus has always been beneath God, though higher than humans. Arian Christology was not a majority view among Unitarians in Poland, Transylvania or England. It was only with the advent of American Unitarianism that it gained a foothold in the Unitarian movement.

Among early Christian theologians who believed in a pre-existent Jesus who was subordinate to God the Father were Lucian of Antioch, Eusebius of Caesarea, Arius, Eusebius of Nicomedia, Asterius the Sophist, Eunomius, and Ulfilas, as well as Felix, Bishop of Urgell. Proponents of this Christology also associate it (more controversially) with Justin Martyr and Hippolytus of Rome. Antitrinitarian Michael Servetus did not deny the pre-existence of Christ, so he may have believed in it. (In his "Treatise Concerning the Divine Trinity" Servetus taught that the Logos (Word) was the reflection of Christ, and "that reflection of Christ was 'the Word with God" that consisted of God Himself, shining brightly in heaven, "and it was God Himself" and that "the Word was the very essence of God or the manifestation of God's essence, and there was in God no other substance or hypostasis than His Word, in a bright cloud where God then seemed to subsist. And in that very spot the face and personality of Christ shone bright.") Isaac Newton had Arian beliefs as well. Famous 19th-century Arian Unitarians include Andrews Norton and Dr. William Ellery Channing (in his earlier years).

Other beliefs 
Although there is no specific authority on convictions of Unitarian belief aside from rejection of the Trinity, the following beliefs are generally accepted:
 One God and the oneness or unity of God.
 The life and teachings of Jesus Christ constitute the exemplar model for living one's own life.
 Reason, rational thought, science, and philosophy coexist with faith in God.
 Humans have the ability to exercise free will in a responsible, constructive and ethical manner with the assistance of religion.
 Human nature in its present condition is neither inherently corrupt nor depraved (see original Sin) but capable of both good and evil, as God intended.
 No religion can claim an absolute monopoly on the Holy Spirit or theological truth.
 Though the authors of the Bible were inspired by God, they were humans and therefore subject to human error.
 The traditional doctrines of predestination, eternal damnation, and the vicarious sacrifice and satisfaction theories of the Atonement are invalid because they malign God's character and veil the true nature and mission of Jesus Christ.

In 1938, The Christian leader attributed "the religion of Jesus, not a religion about Jesus" to Unitarians, though the phrase was used earlier by Congregationalist Rollin Lynde Hartt in 1924.

Worship 
Worship within the Unitarian tradition accommodates a wide range of understandings of God, while the focus of the service may be simply the celebration of life itself. Each Unitarian congregation is at liberty to devise its own form of worship, though commonly, Unitarians will light their chalice (symbol of faith), have a story for all ages; and include sermons, prayers, hymns and songs.  Some will allow attendees to publicly share their recent joys or concerns.

Modern Christian Unitarian organizations 

This section relates to Unitarian churches and organizations today which are still specifically Christian, whether within or outside Unitarian Universalism. Unitarian Universalism, conversely, refers to the embracing of non-Christian religions.

International groups 

Some Unitarian Christian groups are affiliated with the International Council of Unitarians and Universalists (ICUU), founded in 1995. The ICUU has "full member" groups in Australia, New Zealand, United Kingdom, Canada, Czech Republic, Denmark, EUU, Finland, Germany, Hungary, Indonesia, India, Nigeria, Pakistan, Philippines, Poland, Romania, South Africa, Spain. Sri Lanka and the United States. Brazil is a Provisional Member

The ICUU includes small "Associate Groups", including Congregazione Italiana Cristiano Unitariana, Turin (founded in 2004) and the Bét Dávid Unitarian Association, Oslo (founded 2005).

Transylvania (Romania)

The largest Unitarian denomination worldwide today is also the oldest Unitarian denomination (since 1565, first use of the term "Unitarian" 1600): the Unitarian Church of Transylvania (in Romania, which is in union with the Unitarian Church in Hungary). The church in Transylvania still looks to the statement of faith, the Summa Universae Theologiae Christianae secundum Unitarios (1787), though today assent to this is not required. The modern Unitarian Church in Hungary (25,000 members) and the Transylvanian Unitarian Church (75,000 members) are affiliated with the International Council of Unitarians and Universalists (ICUU) and claim continuity with the historical Unitarian Christian tradition established by Ferenc Dávid in 1565 in Transylvania under John II Sigismund Zápolya. The Unitarian churches in Hungary and Transylvania are structured and organized along a church hierarchy that includes the election by the synod of a national bishop who serves as superintendent of the Church. Many Hungarian Unitarians embrace the principles of rationalist Unitarianism. Unitarian high schools exist only in Transylvania (Romania), including the John Sigismund Unitarian Academy in Cluj-Napoca, the Protestant Theological Institute of Cluj, and the Berde Mózes Unitárius Gimnázium in Cristuru Secuiesc; both teach Rationalist Unitarianism.

United Kingdom 

The Unitarian Christian Association (UCA) was founded in the United Kingdom in 1991 by Rev. Lancelot Garrard (1904–93) and others to promote specifically Christian ideas within the General Assembly of Unitarian and Free Christian Churches (GAUFCC), the national Unitarian body in Great Britain. Just as the UUCF and ICUU maintain formal links with the Unitarian Universalist Association in the US, so the UCA is an affiliate body of the GAUFCC in Great Britain.

The majority of Unitarian Christian publications are sponsored by an organization and published specifically for their membership. Generally, they do not serve as a tool for missionary work or encouraging conversions.

India
In India, three different schools of Unitarian thought influenced varying movements, including the Brahmo Samaj, the Unitarian Church of the Khasi Hills, and the Unitarian Christian Church of Chennai, in Madras, founded in 1795. As of 2011, "Thirty-five congregations and eight fellowships comprising almost 10,000 Unitarians now form the Unitarian Union of North East India."

United States

Unitarian Universalist Association (UUA) is a network of liberal religious congregations affirming the worth and dignity of every person, shared ethical principles and reverence for a variety of theological sources. The UUA was formed in 1961 by the consolidation of the American Unitarian Association and the Universalist Church of America.

Individual congregations may choose to elevate all of the sources of faith in their worship, or, in their context, move toward affirming particular sources as predominant. As of 2020, the UUA reports 187,689 individual members active in 1,027 congregations.

During the US Civil Rights Movements, the murders of the US veteran Jimmie Lee Jackson, the Unitarian Universalist Minister James Reeb, and Unitarian Universalist lay leader Viola Liuzzo during the time of the marches from Selma to Montgomery highlighted the bigotry and violence of racial injustice to the wider American public. According to the historian Rev. Mark Morrison-Reed, on the final day of the march, "among the 30,000 who marched were about 500 UU lay people and about 250 UU ministers. The ministers who went to Selma represented a quarter to a third of all UU ministers in full fellowship." The Selma protests were critical to supporting passage of the Voting Rights Act of 1965.

The current President of the Unitarian Universalist Association (UUA) is Rev. Susan Frederick Gray. Rev. Gray notes, for Unitarian Universalists, "Our work for justice and equity—our work to dismantle white supremacy culture, racism, and oppression in ourselves and in our world—is the faithful response to our theology of interdependence." 

The Unitarian Universalist Christian Fellowship (UUCF) was founded in 1945, originally to support Unitarian Christians in the American Unitarian Association. The mission expanded to support Christian members of Universalist Church of America (UCA) in the newly formed Unitarian Universalist Association (UUA) in 1961. UUCF continues as an affiliate of the Unitarian Universalist Association (UUA) serving Christian members seeking to "freely follow Jesus".

The American Unitarian Conference (AUC) was formed in 2000 and stands between UUA and ICUU in attachment to the Christian element of modern Unitarianism. The American Unitarian Conference is open to non-Christian Unitarians, being particularly popular with non-Christian theists and deists. As of 2009, The AUC has three congregations in the United States.

Unitarian Christian Ministries International was a Unitarian ministry incorporated in South Carolina until its dissolution in 2013 when it merged with the Unitarian Christian Emerging Church. The Unitarian Christian Emerging Church has recently undergone reorganization and today is known as the Unitarian Christian Church of America.

Australia and New Zealand 
The Sydney Unitarian Church was founded 1850 under a Reverend Mr Stanley and was a vigorous denomination during the 19th century. The modern church, no longer unitarian Christian,  has properties in Adelaide, Sydney and Melbourne, and smaller congregations elsewhere in Australia and New Zealand.

South Africa 
The Unitarian movement in South Africa was founded in 1867 by David Faure, member of a well-known Cape family. He encountered advanced liberal religious thought while completing his studies at the University of Leiden in Holland for the ministry of the Dutch Reformed Church in Cape Town.

Ireland 
There are two active Unitarian churches in Ireland, one in Dublin and the other in Cork.  Both are member churches of the Non-subscribing Presbyterian Church of Ireland.

Denmark 

Unitarianism was a latecomer to Denmark. Some of the inspiration came from Norway and England – family members of the founders, and the wife of Edward Grieg. 1900-1918 the society priest was Uffe Birkedal, who had previously been a Lutheran priest. He held the first worship 18 February 1900. A founding general assembly 18 May 1900 elected Mary Bess Westenholz as the first chairman of the Society. The Society newsletter was named ‘Protestantisk Tidende’ 1904-1993, and then renamed ‘Unitaren’, reflecting a gradually changing perception of being part of the Danish Lutheran Church, to one where this was no longer assumed.

Biblical Unitarians

Biblical Unitarianism (also known as "biblical Unitarianism" or "biblical unitarianism") identifies the Christian belief that the Bible teaches that God the Father is one singular being, and that Jesus Christ is a distinct being, his son, but not divine. A few denominations use this term to describe themselves, clarifying the distinction between them and those churches which, from the late 19th century, evolved into modern British Unitarianism and, primarily in the United States, Unitarian Universalism. In 16th-century Italy, Biblical Unitarianism was powered by the ideas of the Non-trinitarian theologians Lelio and Fausto Sozzini, founders of Socinianism; their doctrine was embraced and further developed by the Unitarian Church of Transylvania during the 16th and 17th centuries. Today, it's represented by the churches associated with the Christian Church in Italy.

Notable Unitarians 

Notable Unitarians include classical composers Edvard Grieg and Béla Bartók; Ralph Waldo Emerson, Theodore Parker, Yveon Seon and Thomas Lamb Eliot in theology and ministry; Oliver Heaviside, Erasmus Darwin, Joseph Priestley, John Archibald Wheeler, Linus Pauling, Sir Isaac Newton and inventor Sir Francis Ronalds in science; George Boole in mathematics; Susan B. Anthony in civil government; Frances Ellen Watkins Harper, Whitney Young of the National Urban League, and Florence Nightingale in humanitarianism and social justice; John Bowring, Samuel Taylor Coleridge and Elizabeth Gaskell in literature; Frank Lloyd Wright in the arts; Josiah Wedgwood, Richard Peacock and Samuel Carter MP in industry; Thomas Starr King in ministry and politics; and Charles William Eliot in education. Julia Ward Howe was a leader in the woman suffrage movement, the first ever woman to be elected to the Academy of Arts and Letters, and author of the "Battle Hymn of the Republic", volumes of poetry, and other writing. Although raised a Quaker, Ezra Cornell, founder of Cornell University in Ithaca, New York, attended the Unitarian church and was one of the founders of Ithaca's First Unitarian Church. Eramus Darwin Shattuck, a signatory to the Oregon State Constitution, founded the first Unitarian church in Oregon in 1865.

Eleven Nobel Prizes have been awarded to Unitarians: Robert Millikan and John Bardeen (twice) in physics; Emily Green Balch, Albert Schweitzer and Linus Pauling for peace; George Wald and David H. Hubel in medicine; Linus Pauling in chemistry; and Herbert A. Simon in economics.

Four presidents of the United States were Unitarians: John Adams, John Quincy Adams, Millard Fillmore, and William Howard Taft. Adlai Stevenson II, the Democratic presidential nominee in 1952 and 1956, was a Unitarian; he was the last Unitarian to be nominated by a major party for president as of 2020. Although a self-styled materialist, Thomas Jefferson was pro-Unitarian to the extent of suggesting that it would become the predominant religion in the United States.

In the United Kingdom, although Unitarianism was the religion of only a small minority of the population, its practitioners had an enormous impact on Victorian politics, not only in the larger cities – Birmingham, Leeds, Manchester and Liverpool – but in smaller communities such as Leicester, where there were so many Unitarian mayors that the Unitarian Chapel was known as the "Mayors' Nest". Numerous Unitarian families were highly significant in the social and political life of Britain from Victorian times to the middle of the 20th century. They included the Nettlefolds, Martineaus, Luptons, Kitsons, Chamberlains and Kenricks. In Birmingham, England, a Unitarian church – the Church of the Messiah – was opened in 1862. It became a cultural and intellectual centre of a whole society, a place where ideas about society were openly and critically discussed.

Other Unitarians include Sir Tim Berners-Lee, inventor of the World Wide Web, Lancelot Ware, founder of Mensa, Sir Adrian Boult, the conductor, Ray Kurzweil, notable inventor and futurist, and C. Killick Millard, founder of the Dignity in Dying society to support voluntary euthanasia. Ram Mohan Roy, an Indian reformer of the 18th century, was a Unitarian who published a book called Precepts of Jesus.

See also 

 Anomoeanism – radical Arians of the 4th century.
 Binitarianism
 Christadelphians
 Divine simplicity
 Jesus in Islam
 Jehovah's Witnesses
 Messianic Judaism
 Monarchianism
 The New Church
 New thought
 Nondualism
 Nontrinitarianism
 Non-Trinitarian churches
 Non-subscribing Presbyterian Church of Ireland, a denomination that maintains close links with Unitarianism while maintaining its own identity.
 Sabellianism
 Tawhid
 Unitarian (disambiguation)
 Unitarian church (disambiguation)

Notes

References

Citations

Sources 

 
 .
 Joseph Henry Allen, Our Liberal Movement in Theology (Boston, 1882)
 Joseph Henry Allen, Sequel to our Liberal Movement (Boston, 1897)
 Anthony F. Buzzard and Charles F. Hunting, The Doctrine of the Trinity: Christianity's Self-Inflicted Wound (Lanham, Maryland, 1998). .
 John White Chadwick, Old and New Unitarian Belief (Boston, 1894).
 George Willis Cooke, Unitarianism in America: a History of its Origin and Development (Boston, 1902).
 Patrick Navas, Divine Truth or Human Tradition: A Reconsideration of the Roman Catholic-Protestant Doctrine of the Trinity in Light of the Hebrew and Christian Scriptures (Bloomington, Indiana 2007). .
 Earl Morse Wilbur, A History of Unitarianism: Socinianism and Its Antecedents, Harvard University Press, 1945.
 Andrew M. Hill, The Unitarian Path, Lindsey Press (London, 1994). .
 Charles A. Howe, For Faith and Freedom: A Short History of Unitarianism in Europe, Skinner House Books (Boston, 1997). .
 

 Unitarisk Kirkesamfund - Unitarian Society in Denmark http://www.unitarerne.dk/

Bibliography 
 Buzzard, A. and Hunting, C. (1998). The Doctrine of the Trinity: Christianity's Self-Inflicted Wound. International Scholars Publications. .
 Lloyd, Walter (1899). The Story of Protestant Dissent and English Unitarianism. London: P. Green.
 Rowe, Mortimer (1959). The Story of Essex Hall . London: Lindsey Press.

Further reading 
 
 Hewett, Austin Phillip (1955). An Unfettered Faith: the Religion of a Unitarian. London: Lindsey Press.

External links 

 Unitarian Ministries International
 Unitarianism at BBC Religions
 American Unitarian Conference
 American Unitarian Reform
 General Assembly of Unitarian and Free Christian Churches (UK)
 Biblical Unitarians

Christian terminology
Nontrinitarianism
Unitarian Universalism